Álvaro Aceves Catalina (born 26 July 2003) is a Spanish professional footballer who plays as a goalkeeper for Real Valladolid Promesas.

Career
Aceves is a youth product of CD Parquesol before moving to Real Valladolid as a benjamín for the Íscar Cup. He was promoted to the Real Valladolid Promesas, eventually becoming their starter. On 15 July 2022, he signed a professional contract with the club until 2025. He was promoted to the senior Valladolid side as third goalkeeper for the 2022–23 season. He made his professional debut with Real Valladolid as a late substitute in a 2–1 La Liga loss to Real Betis in February 2023, making 3 saves and keeping a clean sheet in his cameo.

International career
Aceves was called up to the Spain U17s in 2020, but did not make an appearance as the call-up was cut short due to the COVID-19 pandemic. He was called up to the Spain U19s in January 2022.

Career statistics

References

External links
 
 
 

2003 births
Living people
Footballers from Valladolid
Spanish footballers
La Liga players
Primera Federación players
Segunda Federación players
Real Valladolid players
Real Valladolid Promesas players
Association football goalkeepers